Qingzhou or Qing Province was one of the Nine Provinces of ancient China dating back to  BCE that later became one of the thirteen provinces of the Han dynasty (206 BCE–220 CE). The Nine Provinces were first described in the Tribute of Yu chapter of the classic Book of Documents, with Qingzhou lying to the east of Yuzhou and north of Yangzhou. Qingzhou's primary territory included most of modern Shandong province except the southwest corner.

History

Ancient times
The territory takes its name from the Tribute of Yu wherein Yu the Great wrote: "Between the sea and Mount Tai there is only Qingzhou". In around 5,000 BCE the area was the cradle of Dongyi culture. During the Xia and Shang dynasties, it was home to the Shuangjiu (Shuǎngjīu), Jize (Jìzé), and Pangboling (Pángbólíng) clans and the state of Pugu.

Zhou dynasty
Following the Duke of Zhou's  BCE successful campaign against the Dongyi states allied with the revolting Three Guards and the rebellious Shang prince Wu Geng, the captured territory of Pugu was granted to Jiang Ziya as the marchland of Qi.

Han dynasty

In 106 BCE, Emperor Wu formally divided the Han Empire into 13 provinces and appointed a Regional Coordinator (also translated as Inspector) in Qingzhou. With the coming of the Eastern Han dynasty in 25 CE, the seat of a local administration moved from Qingzhou to the former Qi capital of Linzi (present-day Linzi District, Zibo, Shandong). In Eastern Han, Qing Province consisted of 5 commanderies, namely Pingyuan, Jinan, Beihai, Qiansheng, Donglai, and the kingdom/principality of Qi.

Tang dynasty
During the Tang dynasty (618–907), Qingzhou held jurisdiction over the seven counties of Yidu (益都), Beihai (北海), Linqu (临朐), Linzi (临淄), Qiancheng (千乘), Bochang (博昌) and Shouguang (寿光) with the administrative centre based in Yidu County.

Northern Song dynasty
The administrative centre of Qingzhou remained in Yidu County during the Northern Song dynasty (960–1127) with the number of counties reduced to six by the removal of Beihai County.

Notes

References
This article is partly based on a translation of 青州 in the Chinese Wikipedia

Provinces of Ancient China
Provinces of the Han dynasty